King Victor Emmanuel III was the monarch of the Kingdom of Italy, from 29 July 1900 until his abdication on 9 May 1946 and of Albania from April 1939 until May 1943.

During his reign Victor Emmanuel was served by a total of 21 prime ministers; 17 from Italy and 4 from Albania.

List of prime ministers

See also

Prime Ministers of Italy
Italian monarchs
Victor Emmanuel III